Pennsylvania's Auditor General election was held November 7, 2000. Incumbent Democrat Bob Casey won reelection by a healthy margin. His Republican challenger was Katie True, a State Representative from the Lancaster area. Both candidates were unopposed in the primary.

General election

References

Auditor General
Pennsylvania Auditor General elections
November 2000 events in the United States
Pennsylvania